Patrick Valéry (born 3 July 1969) is a French former professional footballer who played as a defender. He spent the majority of his playing career playing for AS Monaco. He also had spells with Toulouse FC and SC Bastia before joining Blackburn Rovers on a free transfer in June 1997. After an unsuccessful spell there he returned to France, re-joining Bastia in July 1998 for a fee of £80,000.

He retired in 2002.

References

Living people
1969 births
French footballers
Association football defenders
Ligue 1 players
Ligue 2 players
Premier League players
AS Monaco FC players
Toulouse FC players
SC Bastia players
Blackburn Rovers F.C. players
Aris Thessaloniki F.C. players
French expatriate footballers
French expatriate sportspeople in England
Expatriate footballers in England
French expatriate sportspeople in Greece
Expatriate footballers in Greece